Erika Marie Anderson is an American film and television actress best known for her role as Greta in A Nightmare on Elm Street 5: The Dream Child (1989) and subsequently the actress Selena Swift in the television series Twin Peaks (1990). Erika married Richard Butler on September 22, 2020.

Life and career
Anderson grew up in Tulsa, Oklahoma, the daughter of a sculptor. She attended Nathan Hale High School and the University of Tulsa, graduating with a major in telecommunications and a minor in theater. While in school, she worked as a disc jockey at Tulsa's only jazz radio station and also began working in television, eventually hosting her own arts program.

After college, she moved to Los Angeles to pursue a career in radio and television. She signed with a modeling agency and worked steadily in New York City, Paris, Milan, and Los Angeles. She appeared in fashion layouts in magazines such as Vogue and Interview. While in Italy, she played the lead in a short experimental film about an Italian vision of the United States called Through Your Eyes.

Her first role in a full-length movie was in the 1988 movie Lifted, and her breakthrough role came in 1989 in the horror movie A Nightmare on Elm Street 5: The Dream Child as Greta Gibson. Anderson appeared in three TV episodes of Twin Peaks, playing twin sisters, Emerald and Jade in Invitation to Love. She starred in the 1991 erotic suspense thriller Zandalee with Nicolas Cage, Judge Reinhold, and Joe Pantoliano.

In 1991, she starred in the suspense thriller Shadows of the Past as Jackie Delaney with Nicholas Campbell. In 1995, she starred with Scott Valentine in Object of Obsession as Margaret, a woman taken hostage by her mysterious new lover. Her last movie was in 2000 in the film Ascension.

Anderson has made many guest appearances on TV shows from Silk Stalkings, Dream On, Twin Peaks, to Red Shoe Diaries (Liar's Tale). The 5-foot 11-inch brunette modeled for various fashion magazines, as well as for photographers Helmut Newton, Douglas Sutter, and sculptor Robert Graham. She has appeared on the cover of at-least five magazines. In 2010 Anderson appeared in Never Sleep Again: The Elm Street Legacy. Anderson was also featured in articles in such magazines as the May 1991 Premiere Magazine, (pages 3842) by Phoebe Hoban, the January 1991 Elle, as well as ITC Entertainment's press kit for the 1991 film Zandalee.

In 2020, Anderson married Richard Butler, the English lead singer of The Psychedelic Furs.

Filmography

Magazine covers
 
Starter Italy 9 September 1991
Mirabella (Canada) November 1990, vol. 2, iss. 6
King (Italy) November 1990, iss. 33
Longevity (USA) December 1989, vol. 2, Iss. 3
Taxi April 1989
Moda (Italy) November 1991
Health (USA) May–June 1995

Other appearances
Anderson is shown on the cover of the EP "Embarrassing Love Songs Two: Greta Gibson Forever" by singer/songwriter Nicole Dollanganger. This is a reference to her role in A Nightmare on Elm Street 5: The Dream Child.

References

External links

University of Tulsa alumni
American television actresses
Actresses from Tulsa, Oklahoma
1963 births
Living people
American film actresses
Female models from Oklahoma
American radio personalities
ITC Entertainment
21st-century American actresses